Bernadette Maria Bowyer (born January 23, 1966 in Brampton, Ontario) is a former field hockey player from Canada.

Bowyer represented her native country at the 1992 Summer Olympics in Barcelona, Spain. The Canadian National Team finished seventh in the competition.

References

External links
 
 
 

1966 births
Living people
Canadian female field hockey players
Olympic field hockey players of Canada
Field hockey players at the 1992 Summer Olympics
Pan American Games medalists in field hockey
Pan American Games silver medalists for Canada
Pan American Games bronze medalists for Canada
Field hockey players at the 1991 Pan American Games
Field hockey players at the 1995 Pan American Games
Field hockey people from Ontario
Sportspeople from Brampton
Medalists at the 1991 Pan American Games
Medalists at the 1995 Pan American Games